Statistics of Empress's Cup in the 2018 season.

Overview
It was contested by 48 teams, and Nippon TV Beleza won the championship.

Results

1st round
JFA Academy Fukushima LSC 1-0 Chifure AS Elfen Saitama
Otani Muroran High School 1-4 Daito Bunka University
Nippon TV Menina 5-2 Kibi International University Charme Okayama Takahashi
Fukuoka J. Anclas 0-3 Waseda University
Mukogawa Women's University 5-4 Shikoku Gakuin University Kagawa West High School
Tokiwagi Gakuen High School LSC 3-1 Albirex Niigata U-18
Kanagawa University 3-2 Ryukyu Deigos
Norddea Hokkaido 1-3 Bunnys Kyoto SC
Fujieda Junshin High School 4-0 Sakuyo High School
Seiwa Gakuen High School 0-4 AS Harima Albion
Seisen University 0-6 Teikyo Heisei University
Angeviolet Hiroshima 4-0 Fukui University of Technology Fukui High School
Sendai University 2-5 Okayama Yunogo Belle
JEF United Chiba U-18 3-0 Tokoha University Tachibana High School
Nippon Sport Science University Fields Yokohama Satellite 0-0 (PSO 5-4) Osaka University of Health and Sport Sciences
NGU Loveledge Nagoya 3-0 Osaka Toin High School

2nd round
Nippon TV Beleza 6-1 JFA Academy Fukushima LSC
Orca Kamogawa FC 6-1 Daito Bunka University
Cerezo Osaka Sakai 1-0 Nippon TV Menina
Mynavi Vegalta Sendai Ladies 2-0 Waseda University
AC Nagano Parceiro 4-0 Mukogawa Women's University
Ehime FC 0-1 Tokiwagi Gakuen High School LSC
Nippatsu Yokohama FC Seagulls 2-1 Kanagawa University
Urawa Reds 5-1 Bunnys Kyoto SC
Nojima Stella Kanagawa Sagamihara 3-0 Fujieda Junshin High School
Sfida Setagaya FC 0-4 AS Harima Albion
Iga FC Kunoichi 1-2 Teikyo Heisei University
JEF United Chiba 2-0 Angeviolet Hiroshima
Albirex Niigata 3-2 Okayama Yunogo Belle
Nippon Sport Science University Fields Yokohama 1-0 JEF United Chiba U-18
Shizuoka Sangyo University Iwata Bonita 6-1 Nippon Sport Science University Fields Yokohama Satellite
INAC Kobe Leonessa 4-0 NGU Loveledge Nagoya

3rd round
Nippon TV Beleza 4-0 Orca Kamogawa FC
Cerezo Osaka Sakai 0-2 Mynavi Vegalta Sendai Ladies
AC Nagano Parceiro 1-0 Tokiwagi Gakuen High School LSC
Nippatsu Yokohama FC Seagulls 0-2 Urawa Reds
Nojima Stella Kanagawa Sagamihara 3-1 AS Harima Albion
Teikyo Heisei University 0-1 JEF United Chiba
Albirex Niigata 3-1 Nippon Sport Science University Fields Yokohama
Shizuoka Sangyo University Iwata Bonita 0-2 INAC Kobe Leonessa

Quarterfinals
Nippon TV Beleza 6-0 Mynavi Vegalta Sendai Ladies
AC Nagano Parceiro 0-1 Urawa Reds
Nojima Stella Kanagawa Sagamihara 0-1 JEF United Chiba
Albirex Niigata 1-2 INAC Kobe Leonessa

Semifinals
Nippon TV Beleza 1-0 Urawa Reds
JEF United Chiba 0-1 INAC Kobe Leonessa

Final
Nippon TV Beleza 4-2 INAC Kobe Leonessa
Nippon TV Beleza won the championship.

References

Empress's Cup
2018 in Japanese women's football